Dawid Stachyra (born 15 August 1985) is a speedway rider from Poland.

Career
He rode in the top tier of British Speedway riding for the Poole Pirates during the 2013 Elite League speedway season. He started his speedway career in England riding for the Ipswich Witches in 2009.

In 2017, he won the Argentine Championship.

References 

1985 births
Living people
Polish speedway riders
Belle Vue Aces riders
Berwick Bandits riders
Ipswich Witches riders
Poole Pirates riders